Gerwin "Smally" Lake (born 9 April 1996) is a Sint Maartener footballer who plays for SV Poortugaal of the Dutch Vierde Divisie, and the Sint Maarten national team. With seven international goals, he is Sint Maarten’s all-time leading goal scorer and has already been described as a “historic figure” for the nation.

Club career
Lake played for the youth teams of VV Spijkenisse. After not being promoted to the first team, he joined Spartaan '20 and played for the A1 team. He left the club and joined VV Oude Maas in 2015. Lake drew the attention of FC Dordrecht of the Eredivisie because of his scoring rate at Oude Maas. He joined Dordrecht in 2016 but left after only one season that was plagued by injury. Although he did not make an appearance for Dordrecht's first team, he did appear for the reserve side, scoring the game-winner from a volley in a 2–1 victory over PEC Zwolle's reserve team.

After a half-season return to VV Oude Maas, he then joined Excelsior Maassluis of the Tweede Divisie from 2017 to 2018. Lake was reportedly a player of interest to Excelsior before he joined FC Dordrecht after scoring over 15 goals and topping the scoring charts with VV Oude Maas in 2016. In total he made 13 league appearances for Maassluis, scoring 3 goals. He also made an appearance in the 2017–18 KNVB Cup as Maassluis was knocked out with a second preliminary round defeat to FC Lisse. Both player and club management had high expectations for the attacking player at his signing, with Lake predicting that he would score 10 to 15 goals that season.

In February 2018 it was announced that Lake would leave Excelsior Maassluis and sign for SV Poortugaal, a club formed from the merger of PSV Poortugaal and his former club VV Oude Maas. Lake cited a lack of playing time as his reason for leaving the club. Lake found his scoring touch again with Poortugaal in 2019, including a four-goal match against RKVV Westlandia on 19 January.

In January 2021 Lake signed a contract extension with SV Poortugaal for the 2020–21 Hoofdklasse season In May of that year he joined Flames United for a short stint ahead of the club’s 2021 Caribbean Club Championship campaign. He started and played the full 90 minutes of the team’s opening match, a 1–11 defeat to O&M FC of the Dominican Republic. He repeated the performance two days later as Flames United was hammered 0–12 by Inter Moengotapoe of Suriname.

Lake again renewed his contract with SV Poortugaal for the 2021–22 Hoofdklasse season.

International career
Lake was first called up to the Sint Maarten national team in March 2019. He qualifies to represent the nation through his Curaçaon father and Sint Maartener mother. He reached out to a representative of the Sint Maarten Soccer Association and was one of approximately thirty players invited to a tryout in the Dutch town of Zeist. He made his first international appearance for the team on 23 March 2019 in a 2019–20 CONCACAF Nations League qualifying match against Saint Martin. He started the match and scored his first two international goals in the eventual 4–3 victory. Lake scored at least one goal in each of his first five matches for Sin Maarten for a total of seven goals over that span.

International goals
Last updated 11 June 2022.

International career statistics

Personal
Lake was born in the Netherlands. He is nicknamed "Smally" for his short stature and is known for his speed.

See also 
 List of top international men's football goalscorers by country

References

External links
National Football Teams profile
Caribbean Football Database profile

Voetbal Nederland profile
Voetbal International profile

Living people
1996 births
Association football midfielders
Sint Maarten international footballers
Sint Maarten footballers
Dutch footballers
VV Spijkenisse players
Excelsior Maassluis players